Sir Kenneth Charles Branagh (born 10 December 1960) is a British actor and filmmaker. Branagh trained at the Royal Academy of Dramatic Art in London and has served as its president since 2015. He has won an Academy Award, four BAFTAs, two Emmy Awards, a Golden Globe Award, and an Olivier Award. He was appointed a Knight Bachelor in the 2012 Birthday Honours. He was made a Freeman of his native city of Belfast in January 2018. In 2020, he was listed at number 20 on The Irish Times list of Ireland's greatest film actors.

Branagh has both directed and starred in several film adaptations of William Shakespeare's plays, of which he is a devoted fan, including Henry V (1989), Much Ado About Nothing (1993), Othello (1995), Hamlet (1996), Love's Labour's Lost (2000), and As You Like It (2006). He was nominated for Academy Awards for Best Actor and Best Director for Henry V and for Best Adapted Screenplay for Hamlet. He also directed Swan Song (1992), which earned an Academy Award for Best Live Action Short Film nomination. He also directed and starred in Dead Again (1991), Mary Shelley's Frankenstein (1994), Jack Ryan: Shadow Recruit (2014), Murder on the Orient Express (2017) and Death on the Nile (2022).

He also directed the Marvel Cinematic Universe (MCU) superhero film Thor (2011) as well as the Disney 2015 adaptation of Cinderella. He starred in the films Celebrity (1998), Wild Wild West (1999), The Road to El Dorado (2000), Harry Potter and the Chamber of Secrets (2002), Valkyrie (2008), The Boat That Rocked (2009), My Week with Marilyn (2011), Dunkirk (2017), and Tenet (2020). For his semi-autobiographical comedy-drama Belfast (2021), Branagh was nominated for the Academy Awards for Best Picture and for Best Director, and he won the Award for Best Original Screenplay.

He has starred in the BBC1 series Fortunes of War (1987), the Channel 4 series Shackleton (2002), and BBC One series Wallander (2008–2016). He received the Primetime Emmy Award for Outstanding Lead Actor in a Limited Series or Movie and a International Emmy Award for Best Actor for his portrayal of SS leader Reinhard Heydrich in the HBO film Conspiracy (2001). He also received a Primetime Emmy Award and a Golden Globe Award nomination for his role as Franklin D. Roosevelt in the HBO film Warm Springs (2005).

Early life 
Branagh, the middle of three children (he has an older brother and a younger sister), was born on 10 December 1960 in Belfast, the son of working-class Protestant parents Frances (née Harper) and William Branagh, a plumber and joiner who ran a company that specialised in fitting partitions and suspended ceilings.  He lived in the Tiger’s Bay area of the city and was educated at Grove Primary School.

In early 1970, at the age of nine, he moved with his family to Reading, Berkshire, England, to escape the Troubles. He was educated at Whiteknights Primary School and Meadway School, a local comprehensive in Tilehurst, where he appeared in school productions such as Toad of Toad Hall and Oh, What a Lovely War! At school, he acquired received pronunciation to avoid bullying. On his identity today he has said, "I feel Irish. I don't think you can take Belfast out of the boy", and he attributes his "love of words" to his Irish heritage.

He attended the amateur Reading Cine & Video Society (now called Reading Film & Video Makers) as a member and was a keen member of Progress Theatre of which he is now the patron. After disappointing A-level results in English, History and Sociology, Branagh went on to train at the Royal Academy of Dramatic Art in London. In 1980, the Principal of RADA, Hugh Cruttwell, asked Branagh to perform a soliloquy from Hamlet for Queen Elizabeth II, during one of her visits to the academy.

Career

Theatre 
Branagh achieved early success in his native Northern Ireland for his role as Billy, the title character in the BBC's Play for Today trilogy known as the Billy Plays (1982–84), written by Graham Reid and set in Belfast.

He received acclaim in the UK for his stage performances, first winning the 1982 SWET Award for Best Newcomer, for his role as Judd in Julian Mitchell's Another Country, after leaving RADA. Branagh was part of the 'new wave' of actors to emerge from the Academy. Others included Jonathan Pryce, Juliet Stevenson, Alan Rickman, Anton Lesser, Bruce Payne and Fiona Shaw. In 1984, he appeared in the Royal Shakespeare Company production of Henry V, directed by Adrian Noble. The production played to sold-out audiences, especially at the Barbican in the City of London. It was this production that he adapted for the film version of the play in 1989. He and David Parfitt founded the Renaissance Theatre Company in 1987, following success with several productions on the London 'Fringe', including Branagh's full-scale production of Romeo and Juliet at the Lyric Studio, co-starring with Samantha Bond. The first major Renaissance production was Branagh's Christmas 1987 staging of Twelfth Night at Riverside Studios in Hammersmith, starring Richard Briers as Malvolio and Frances Barber as Viola, and with an original score by actor, musician, and composer Patrick Doyle, who two years later was to compose the music for Branagh's film adaptation of Henry V. This Twelfth Night was later adapted for television.

Branagh became a major presence in the media and on the British stage when Renaissance collaborated with Birmingham Rep for a 1988 touring season of three Shakespeare plays under the umbrella title of Renaissance Shakespeare on the Road, which also played a repertory season at the Phoenix Theatre in London. It featured directorial debuts for Judi Dench with Much Ado About Nothing (starring Branagh and Samantha Bond  as Benedick and Beatrice), Geraldine McEwan with As You Like It, and Derek Jacobi directing Branagh in the title role in Hamlet, with Sophie Thompson as Ophelia. Critic Milton Shulman of the London Evening Standard wrote: "On the positive side Branagh has the vitality of Olivier, the passion of Gielgud, the assurance of Guinness, to mention but three famous actors who have essayed the role. On the negative side, he has not got the magnetism of Olivier, nor the mellifluous voice quality of Gielgud nor the intelligence of Guinness."

A year later, in 1989, Branagh co-starred with Emma Thompson in the Renaissance company's revival of Look Back in Anger. Judi Dench directed both the theatre and television productions, presented first in Belfast then at the London Coliseum and Lyric Theatre.

In 1990, he wrote his autobiography Beginning, recounting his life and acting career up to that point. In the book's introduction, he admits that the main reason for producing the book was "money" and that "The deal was made, and a handsome advance was paid out. The advance provided the funds to buy accommodation for the Company's offices, this moving Renaissance out of my flat and bringing me a little closer to sanity."

In 2002, Branagh starred at the Crucible Theatre, Sheffield as Richard III. In 2003, he starred in the Royal National Theatre's production of David Mamet's Edmond. Branagh directed The Play What I Wrote in England in 2001 and directed a Broadway production in 2003. From September to November 2008, Branagh appeared at Wyndham's Theatre as the title character in the Donmar West End revival of Anton Chekhov's Ivanov in a new version by Tom Stoppard. His performance was lauded as the "performance of the year" by several critics. It won him the Critics' Circle Theatre Award for Best Male Performance but did not get him a Laurence Olivier Award nomination, to the surprise of critics.

In July 2013, he co-directed Macbeth at Manchester International Festival with Rob Ashford. With Branagh in the title role, Alex Kingston played Lady Macbeth and Ray Fearon featured as Macduff. The final performance of the completely sold-out run was broadcast to cinemas on 20 July as part of National Theatre Live. He repeated his performance and directorial duties opposite Ashford and Kingston when the production moved to New York City's Park Avenue Armory in June 2014. The production marked his Broadway stage debut.

In April 2015, Branagh announced his formation of the Kenneth Branagh Theatre Company, in which he would appear as actor-manager. With the company, he announced he would present a season of five shows at London's Garrick Theatre from October 2015 – November 2016. The shows were The Winter's Tale, a double bill of Harlequinade and All On Her Own, Red Velvet, The Painkiller, Romeo and Juliet and The Entertainer. Branagh directed all but The Entertainer, in which he starred. Branagh also starred in The Winter's Tale, Harlequinade and The Painkiller. Kenneth Branagh Theatre Company also includes Judi Dench (The Winter's Tale), Zoë Wanamaker (Harlequinade/All On Her Own), Derek Jacobi, Lily James and Richard Madden (Romeo and Juliet) and Rob Brydon (The Painkiller). In September 2015, it was announced that The Winter's Tale, Romeo and Juliet, and The Entertainer would be broadcast in cinemas, in partnership with Picturehouse Entertainment.

Film 
Branagh is known for his film adaptations of William Shakespeare, beginning with Henry V (1989), followed by Much Ado About Nothing (1993), Othello (1995), Hamlet (1996), Love's Labour's Lost (2000) and As You Like It (2006). As You Like It premiered in theatres in Europe but premiered on television in the U.S., where it aired on HBO in August 2007.

Notable non-Shakespeare films in which Branagh has appeared include Dead Again (1991) and Mary Shelley's Frankenstein (1994), both of which he also directed, Wild Wild West (1999), provided the voice of Miguel, a con artist in the DreamWorks Animation film The Road to El Dorado (2000), Rabbit-Proof Fence (2002) and as Major General Henning von Tresckow in Valkyrie (2008). He starred as Gilderoy Lockhart in Harry Potter and the Chamber of Secrets (2002). He also played the Minister, Dormandy (a parody of PMG Tony Benn), in the film The Boat That Rocked (2009).

Although he had a notable uncredited role as SS-Sturmbannführer Knopp in director Thomas Carter's 1993 film Swing Kids, between 1989 and 1996, Branagh mostly directed his own films, including Peter's Friends, with a cast including former student friends Emma Thompson, Hugh Laurie, Tony Slattery, and Stephen Fry, as well as Imelda Staunton and Rita Rudner. However, the commercial and critical failure of Love's Labour's Lost paused his directorial career. In 2006, the same year that Branagh's film version of As You Like It was released, he also directed a film version of Mozart's opera The Magic Flute. Branagh has also directed the thriller Sleuth (2007), a remake of the 1972 film. At a film promotion for Valkyrie in 2008, Branagh confirmed that he would be directing Thor, a film based on the Marvel superhero. Thor, Branagh's return to big-budget directing, was released on 6 May 2011. In 2011, Branagh portrayed Laurence Olivier in My Week with Marilyn, which won him a Best Supporting Actor nomination at the 84th Academy Awards. Branagh directed Disney's live-action adaptation of Cinderella (2015). Branagh played a Royal Navy Commander in Christopher Nolan's 2017 action-thriller Dunkirk, based on the British military evacuation of the French city of Dunkirk in 1940 during World War II.

Branagh directed and starred in a film adaptation of Agatha Christie's detective novel Murder on the Orient Express (2017) as Hercule Poirot. Production began in London in November 2016. Like Branagh's Hamlet in 1996, it is among the very few to use 65mm film cameras since 1970. In 2018, he directed the film All Is True, in which he starred as William Shakespeare. Branagh also directed the fantasy adventure film Artemis Fowl, which was released on Disney+ in June 2020.

In May 2019, Branagh was cast in Christopher Nolan's Tenet in which he portrayed the villain Andrei Sator and was praised for his performance. Branagh's semi-autobiographical 2021 film Belfast earned him Academy Award nominations for Best Picture, Best Director and Best Original Screenplay (winning the latter). He reprised his role as Hercule Poirot in 2022's Death on the Nile, a sequel to Murder on the Orient Express which he also directed. In March 2021, Branagh signed on to direct a biopic of music group the Bee Gees. In March 2022, it was revealed that Branagh left the project due to scheduling conflicts and was replaced by John Carney. In October 2022, it was announced that Branagh would direct and star in a third Poirot film titled A Haunting in Venice, based on Christie's Hallowe'en Party.

Branagh has frequently reused actors, including Brian Blessed, Judi Dench, Robin Williams, Derek Jacobi, Nonso Anozie, Nicholas Farrell, Richard Briers, Stellan Skarsgård, Helena Bonham Carter, John Gielgud, Josh Gad, Ian Holm, and Emma Thompson. He also works frequently with composer Patrick Doyle.

Television 
Branagh has been involved in several made-for-TV films. Among his most acclaimed portrayals is that of US President Franklin D. Roosevelt in the film Warm Springs (2005), for which he received an Emmy Award nomination. The film received 16 Emmy nominations, winning five (including Outstanding Made for Television Movie); Branagh did not win the award for his portrayal. He received an Emmy for his portrayal of SS leader Reinhard Heydrich in the TV film Conspiracy (2001), a depiction of the Wannsee Conference, where Nazi officials decided on the Final Solution. In 2002, Branagh starred in the two-part television movie Shackleton, a dramatization of the 1914 Imperial Trans-Antarctic Expedition's battle for survival, for which he was nominated for a BAFTA award and an Emmy. In 1998, he narrated the 24-episode documentary series Cold War. Branagh also narrated the BBC documentaries Walking with Dinosaurs, World War I in Colour, Walking with Beasts and Walking with Monsters, and the BBC miniseries Great Composers.

Branagh is the star of the English-language Wallander television series, adaptations of Henning Mankell's best-selling Wallander crime novels. Branagh plays the eponymous Inspector Kurt Wallander and also serves as the executive producer of the series. The first series of three episodes was broadcast on BBC One in November and December 2008. Branagh won the award for best actor at the 35th Broadcasting Press Guild Television and Radio Awards (2009). It was his first major television award win in the UK. He received his first BAFTA TV on 26 April 2009 for the British Academy Television Award for Best Drama Series. For his performance in the episode One Step Behind, he was nominated in the Outstanding Actor, Miniseries, or Movie category of the 61st Primetime Emmy Awards. The role also gained him a nomination for Best Actor at the 2009 Crime Thriller Awards. The second Wallander series of three episodes aired initially in January 2010 on the BBC, and the third season aired in July 2012. The fourth and final series was shot from October 2014 to January 2015 and premiered on German TV, dubbed into German, in December 2015; it aired in the UK, with its original English soundtrack, in May and June 2016.

Radio 
Branagh has played the title role in BBC radio broadcasts of Hamlet and Cyrano de Bergerac, and the role of Edmund in King Lear.

Other work 
Branagh has narrated several audiobooks, such as The Magician's Nephew by C. S. Lewis and Heart of Darkness by Joseph Conrad. Branagh has narrated numerous documentary series, including Cold War (1998), Walking with Dinosaurs (1999), The Ballad of Big Al (2001), Walking with Beasts (2001), Walking with Monsters (2005), and World War 1 in Colour (2005).

Branagh participated in the 2012 Summer Olympics opening ceremony portraying Isambard Kingdom Brunel during the Industrial Revolution segment "Pandemonium" where he performed one of Caliban's speeches from Shakespeare's The Tempest.

Personal life 
From 1989 to 1995, Branagh was married to actress Emma Thompson. They appeared together in Fortunes of War, Look Back in Anger, Henry V, Much Ado About Nothing, Dead Again, and Peter's Friends. More recently, they both appeared in The Boat That Rocked, and the Harry Potter series, though with no shared scenes in either. During their marriage, and while directing and co-starring with Helena Bonham Carter in Mary Shelley's Frankenstein, he began an affair with Bonham Carter. After Thompson divorced him, he and Bonham Carter were in a well-publicised relationship until 1999. In 2003, he married film art director Lindsay Brunnock, whom he met during the shooting of Shackleton.

Branagh has said he became "much more religious" after listening to Laurence Olivier's dramatic reading of the Bible every morning, in preparation for his role as Olivier in My Week With Marilyn.

He is a fan of English football club Tottenham Hotspur, the Northern Irish football club Linfield, and Scottish football club Rangers.

Filmography

Awards and honours 

Branagh has been nominated for eight Academy Awards and is the first individual to be nominated in seven different categories. His first two nominations were for Henry V (one each for directing and acting). He also received similar BAFTA Award nominations for his film work, winning one for his direction. His first BAFTA TV award came in April 2009, for Best Drama Series (Wallander). Branagh received two other Academy Award nominations for the 1992 film short subject Swan Song and for his work on the screenplay of Hamlet in 1996. His 5th nomination came for his portrayal of Laurence Olivier in My Week With Marilyn in 2012. This was followed by three nominations in 2022 for Belfast – his first nominations for Original Screenplay and Best Picture, winning for Original Screenplay. He thereby became the first person to have been nominated in seven different categories of the Academy Awards, surpassing Walt Disney, George Clooney, and Alfonso Cuarón, each of whom have received nominations in six categories (the latest equalled Branagh the year after).

He is Honorary President of NICVA (the Northern Ireland Council for Voluntary Action). He received an honorary Doctorate in Literature from Queen's University of Belfast in 1990. He is also a patron for the charity Over The Wall. Branagh was the youngest actor to receive the Golden Quill (also known as the Gielgud Award) in 2000. In 2001, he was appointed an honorary Doctor of Literature at the Shakespeare Institute of The University of Birmingham; the Shakespeare Institute Library keeps the archive of his Renaissance Theatre Company and Renaissance Films.

On 10 July 2009, Branagh was presented with the Lifetime Achievement Award at the RomaFictionFest.

He was appointed a Knight Bachelor in the 2012 Birthday Honours for services to drama and to the community in Northern Ireland. He received the accolade at Buckingham Palace on 9 November 2012; afterwards, Branagh told a BBC reporter that he felt "humble, elated, and incredibly lucky" to be knighted.

In October 2015, it was announced that Branagh would be the new President of the Royal Academy of Dramatic Art (RADA), succeeding the late Richard, Lord Attenborough. As the President of RADA and one of the highest profile actors and filmmakers in contemporary British popular culture, Branagh appeared on Debrett's 2017 list of the most influential people in the UK. In October 2017, it was announced that Branagh would be conferred with the Freedom of the City of Belfast. The honour was officially conferred on him by the Lord Mayor of Belfast, Councillor Nuala McAllister, at a ceremony in the Ulster Hall in Belfast on 30 January 2018. He was awarded the Freedom of the Town of Stratford-upon-Avon on 22 April 2022.

Discography 
 Shakespeare's Richard III (complete) for Naxos Audiobooks
 In the Ravine & Other Short Stories by Anton Chekhov (unabridged) for Naxos Audiobooks
 Felix Mendelssohn's incidental music for A Midsummer Night's Dream (speaker) live recording for Sony Classical, conducted by Claudio Abbado
 The Diary of Samuel Pepys 1660–1669 (abridged) for Hodder Headline Audio Classics
 The Magician's Nephew by C.S. Lewis for Harper Books
 Shakespeare's "Sonnet 30" for the 2002 compilation album, When Love Speaks (EMI Classics)
 Mary Shelley's Frankenstein [Abridged]
 Joseph Conrad's Heart of Darkness for Audible.com.

Notes

References

Further reading 
 Kenneth Branagh (1990 [1989]) Beginning, London: Chatto and Windus, ; New York: W. W. Norton & Co, .
 Ian Shuttleworth (1994) Ken & Em, London: Headline. .
 Mark White (2005) Kenneth Branagh, London: Faber and Faber. .

External links 

 
 
 Biography on Tiscali film section
 Kenneth Branagh interview from Premiere (1996)
 Branagh Collection at Queen's University, Belfast
 Renaissance Theatre Company Archive, Shakespeare Institute, University of Birmingham
 Branagh's Wallander – Website relating to the BBC's English-language Wallander starring Kenneth Branagh

 
1960 births
20th-century male actors from Northern Ireland
21st-century male actors from Northern Ireland
Actor-managers
Actors awarded knighthoods
Alumni of RADA
Audiobook narrators
BAFTA Outstanding British Contribution to Cinema Award
Best Actor BAFTA Award (television) winners
Best Director BAFTA Award winners
Best Screenplay Golden Globe winners
Critics' Circle Theatre Award winners
Emmy Award winners
International Emmy Award for Best Actor winners
English-language film directors
European Film Award for Best Actor winners
Film directors from Northern Ireland
Film producers from Northern Ireland
People from Northern Ireland of English descent
Knights Bachelor
Living people
Male actors from Belfast
Male actors from Berkshire
Male film actors from Northern Ireland
Male Shakespearean actors from Northern Ireland
Male stage actors from Northern Ireland
Male television actors from Northern Ireland
Male voice actors from Northern Ireland
Male writers from Northern Ireland
Outstanding Performance by a Lead Actor in a Miniseries or Movie Primetime Emmy Award winners
Actors from Reading, Berkshire
Royal Shakespeare Company members
Screenwriters from Northern Ireland
Television directors from Northern Ireland
Television editors from Northern Ireland
Television producers from Northern Ireland
Television writers from Northern Ireland
British male television writers
Best Original Screenplay Academy Award winners